Gérard Debreu (4 July 1921 – 31 December 2004) was a French-born economist and mathematician. Best known as a professor of economics at the University of California, Berkeley, where he began work in 1962, he won the 1983 Nobel Memorial Prize in Economic Sciences.

Biography
His father was the business partner of his maternal grandfather in lace manufacturing, a traditional industry in Calais. Debreu was orphaned at an early age, as his father committed suicide and his mother died of natural causes. Prior to the start of World War II, he received his baccalauréat and went to Ambert to begin preparing for the entrance examination of a grande école. Later on, he moved from Ambert to Grenoble to complete his preparation, both places being in Vichy France during World War II. In 1941, he was admitted to the École Normale Supérieure in Paris, along with Marcel Boiteux. He was influenced by Henri Cartan and the Bourbaki writers. When he was about to take the final examinations in 1944, the Normandy landings occurred and he, instead, enlisted in the French army. He was transferred for training to Algeria and then served in the occupying French Forces in Germany until July 1945. 
Debreu passed the Agrégation de Mathématiques exams at the end of 1945 and the beginning of 1946. By this time, he had become interested in economics, particularly in the general equilibrium theory of Léon Walras. From 1946 to 1948, he was an assistant in the Centre National de la Recherche Scientifique. During these two and a half years, he made the transition from mathematics to economics. In 1948, Debreu went to the United States on a Rockefeller Fellowship which allowed him to visit several American universities, as well as those in Uppsala and Oslo in 1949–50. He received his Ph.D. from the University of Paris in 1956. In 1960 he became a professor at the University of California, where he taught until 1991.

Debreu married Françoise Bled in 1946 and they had two daughters, Chantal and Florence, born in 1946 and 1950 respectively.

Debreu died in Paris at the age of 83 of natural causes on New Year's Eve, 2004.

Academic career
Debreu began working as a Research Associate and joined the Cowles Commission at the University of Chicago in the summer of 1950. He remained there for five years, returning to Paris periodically.

In 1954, he published a breakthrough paper, entitled Existence of an Equilibrium for a Competitive Economy, together with Kenneth Arrow, in which they provided a definitive mathematical proof of the existence of a general equilibrium, using topological rather than calculus-based methods.

In 1955, he moved to Yale University.

In 1959, he published his classical monograph, Theory of Value: An Axiomatic Analysis of Economic Equilibrium (Cowles Foundation Monographs Series), which is one of the most important works in mathematical economics. He also studied several problems in the theory of cardinal utility, in particular the additive decomposition of a utility function defined on a Cartesian product of sets.

In this monograph, Debreu set up an axiomatic foundation for competitive markets. He also established the existence of an equilibrium using a novel approach. The main idea of his argument is to show that there exists a price system for which the aggregate excess demand correspondence vanishes. He did so by proving a type of fixed-point theorem that is based on the Kakutani fixed-point theorem. In Chapter 7, Debreu introduced the concept of uncertainty and showed how it could be incorporated into the deterministic model. Here, he introduced the notion of a contingent commodity, which is a promise to deliver a good should a certain state of nature be realized. This concept is very frequently used in financial economics, where it is known as the "Arrow–Debreu security".

In 1960–61, he worked at the Center for Advanced Study in the Behavioral Sciences at Stanford and devoted most of his time to the complex proof that appeared in 1962 of a general theorem on the existence of an economic equilibrium.

In January 1962, he started working at the University of California, Berkeley, where he held the titles of University Professor and Class of 1958 Professor of Economics and Mathematics Emeritus.

During his sabbaticals in the late 1960s and 1970s, he visited universities in Leiden, Cambridge, Bonn and Paris. In 1987, he visited the University of Canterbury as an Erskine Fellow, lecturing in economic theory.

His later studies centred mainly on the theory of differentiable economies, where he showed that, in general, aggregate excess demand functions vanish at a finite number of points – basically, he showed that economies have a finite number of price equilibria.

In 1976, he received the French Legion of Honour. He was awarded the 1983 Bank of Sweden Prize in Economic Sciences in Memory of Alfred Nobel, for having incorporated new analytical methods into economic theory and for his rigorous reformulation of general equilibrium theory. He was a member of the International Academy of Science, the American Academy of Arts and Sciences, the United States National Academy of Sciences, and the American Philosophical Society.

In 1990, he served as president of the American Economic Association.

Major publications

Books 
 
 
The twenty papers: The coefficient of resource utilization · A social equilibrium existence theorem · A classical tax-subsidy problem · Existence of an equilibrium for a competitive economy (by Gérard Debreu and Kenneth J. Arrow) · Valuation equilibrium and Pareto optimum · Representation of a preference ordering by a numerical function · Market equilibrium · Economics under uncertainty · Topological methods in cardinal utility theory · New concepts and techniques for equilibrium analysis · A limit theorem on the core of an economy (by Gérard Debreu and Herbert Scarf) · Contuinity properties of Paretian utility · Neighboring economic agents · Economies with a finite set of equilibria · Smooth preferences · Excess demand functions · The rate of convergence of the core of an economy · Four aspects of the mathematical theory of economic equilibrium · The application to economics of differential topology and global analysis: differentiable economies · Least concave utility functions

Book chapters 
  Pdf.
  Pdf.

Journal articles 
  Pdf. 
 
  Full text.
  Pdf.
  Pdf.
 
  Pdf.
  Pdf.
  Pdf.
  Pdf.
  Pdf.
 
  Pdf.
  Pdf.
  Pdf.
 
 
  Pdf. 
  Pdf.
  
 
  Pdf. 
  Pdf.
 
 
 
 
 
 
  Pdf.
  Pdf.
 
  (Presidential address delivered at the 103rd meeting of the American Economic Association, 29 December 1990, Washington, DC.) Full text.

References

External links

  including the Nobel Lecture December 8, 1983 Economic Theory in the Mathematical Mode
 Obituary for Debreu
 Guide to the Gérard Debreu Papers at The Bancroft Library
 Lectures on Mathematical Economics from 1987 at University of Canterbury  via YouTube
 
 

1921 births
2004 deaths
People from Calais
French emigrants to the United States
French economists
Nobel laureates in Economics
Mathematical economists
Welfare economists
General equilibrium theorists
French Nobel laureates
American Nobel laureates
Members of the French Academy of Sciences
Members of the United States National Academy of Sciences
École Normale Supérieure alumni
University of California, Berkeley College of Letters and Science faculty
20th-century American economists
Fellows of the Econometric Society
Presidents of the Econometric Society
Presidents of the American Economic Association
Distinguished Fellows of the American Economic Association